Anthony Joseph Palmer (4 February 1966 – 20 July 2014) was a British-born South African theologian, missiologist, missionary and author.

Palmer was born in the United Kingdom and moved to South Africa when he was 10 years old. He and his wife maintained a website, called the Ark Community, which is described as "an internet-based, Inter-denominational Christian Convergent Community, drawing our spirituality from the “Early Church” (33-600AD), in particular, Celtic Christian spirituality." On the Ark Community website he was known as "Father Tony Palmer" instead of using the style The Right Reverend or the title "Bishop".

In January 2014, Palmer was sent by Pope Francis as a special envoy to a Charismatic Evangelical Leadership Conference hosted by Kenneth Copeland. During the conference, Palmer presented a short video message from the Pope. Palmer and Pope Francis were personal friends. The message was recorded when the two met a week prior to the Kenneth Copeland Ministries leaders' conference. Pope Francis suggested the recording and it was recorded on Palmer's iPhone. The message is one of brotherhood, unity and love. A declaration that the Reformation protest has ended. At the end of the presentation and video message, Copeland prayed for the Pope and recorded his own message back to the Pope.

Palmer continued the message of unity and released a video on 28 February 2014, titled "The Miracle of Unity has Begun", on the Ark Community website with the apparent approval of Pope Francis. Catholic website The Wild Voice was the first to provide a transcript of the controversial video in which Palmer said, "The real gift of communion is finding our brother. For those of us who have ears to hear, let us hear, because this is both profound and revolutionary. Pope Francis is calling us into an authentic communion based on the fact that we are brothers and sisters in Christ, not communion through our common traditions. This is a new way forward."

Palmer died on 20 July 2014 after injuries sustained in a motorbike accident.

References

1966 births

2014 deaths

Road incident deaths in the United Kingdom

South African theologians
20th-century British people
Convergence Movement
Charismatics pastors